Chlorurus strongylocephalus, commonly known as the steephead parrotfish, is a species of marine ray-finned fish, a parrotfish from the family Scaridae which is native to the Indian Ocean, where it lives in coral reefs. Its range extends from the Gulf of Aden and Socotra down the coast of East Africa as far south as Mozambique and across the Indian Ocean to western Indonesia. It forms a species complex with Chlorurus gibbus of the Red Sea and Chlorurus microrhinos of the west-central Pacific.

Gallery

References

Fish of the Indian Ocean
Taxa named by Pieter Bleeker
Fish described in 1854
Fish of Thailand
strongylocephalus